The University of Chicago (UChicago, Chicago, U of C, or UChi) is a private research university in Chicago. The university, established in 1890, has its main campus in Chicago's Hyde Park neighborhood. Admissions at the University of Chicago are considered highly selective.

The university is composed of an undergraduate college and five graduate research divisions, which contain all of the university's graduate programs and interdisciplinary committees. It has eight professional schools: the Law School; the Booth School of Business; the Pritzker School of Medicine; the Crown Family School of Social Work, Policy, and Practice; the Harris School of Public Policy; the Divinity School; the Graham School of Continuing Liberal and Professional Studies; and the Pritzker School of Molecular Engineering. The university has additional campuses and centers in London, Paris, Beijing, Delhi, and Hong Kong, as well as in downtown Chicago.

University of Chicago scholars have played a major role in the development of many academic disciplines, including economics, law, literary criticism, mathematics, physics, religion, sociology, and political science, establishing the Chicago schools in various fields. Chicago's Metallurgical Laboratory produced the world's first man-made, self-sustaining nuclear reaction in Chicago Pile-1 beneath the viewing stands of the university's Stagg Field.  Advances in chemistry led to the "radiocarbon revolution" in the carbon-14 dating of ancient life and objects. The university research efforts include administration of Fermi National Accelerator Laboratory and Argonne National Laboratory, as well as the Marine Biological Laboratory. The university is also home to the University of Chicago Press, the largest university press in the United States.

The University of Chicago's students, faculty, and staff include 97 Nobel laureates. The university's faculty members and alumni also include 10 Fields Medalists, 4 Turing Award winners, 52 MacArthur Fellows, 26 Marshall Scholars, 53 Rhodes Scholars, 27 Pulitzer Prize winners, 20 National Humanities Medalists, 29 living billionaire graduates, and eight Olympic medalists.

History

Early years
 
The University of Chicago was incorporated as a coeducational institution in 1890 by the American Baptist Education Society, using $400,000 donated to the ABES to supplement a $600,000 donation from Standard Oil co-founder John D. Rockefeller, and including land donated by Marshall Field. While the Rockefeller donation provided money for academic operations and long-term endowment, it was stipulated that such money could not be used for buildings. The Hyde Park campus was financed by donations from wealthy Chicagoans like Silas B. Cobb who provided the funds for the campus' first building, Cobb Lecture Hall, and matched Marshall Field's pledge of $100,000. Other early benefactors included businessmen Charles L. Hutchinson (trustee, treasurer and donor of Hutchinson Commons), Martin A. Ryerson (president of the board of trustees and donor of the Ryerson Physical Laboratory) Adolphus Clay Bartlett and Leon Mandel, who funded the construction of the gymnasium and assembly hall, and George C. Walker of the Walker Museum, a relative of Cobb who encouraged his inaugural donation for facilities.

The Hyde Park campus continued the legacy of the original university of the same name, which had closed in the 1880s after its campus was foreclosed on.  What became known as the Old University of Chicago had been founded by a small group of Baptist educators in 1856 through a land endowment from Senator Stephen A. Douglas. After a fire, it closed in 1886.  Alumni from the Old University of Chicago are recognized as alumni of the present University of Chicago. The university's depiction on its coat of arms of a phoenix rising from the ashes is a reference to the fire, foreclosure, and demolition of the Old University of Chicago campus. As an homage to this pre-1890 legacy, a single stone from the rubble of the original Douglas Hall on 34th Place was brought to the current Hyde Park location and set into the wall of the Classics Building. These connections have led the dean of the college and University of Chicago and professor of history John Boyer to conclude that the University of Chicago has, "a plausible genealogy as a pre–Civil War institution".

William Rainey Harper became the university's president on July 1, 1891, and the Hyde Park campus opened for classes on October 1, 1892.  Harper worked on building up the faculty and in two years he had a faculty of 120, including eight former university or college presidents.  Harper was an accomplished scholar (Semiticist) and a member of the Baptist clergy who believed that a great university should maintain the study of faith as a central focus. To fulfill this commitment, he brought the Baptist seminary that had begun as an independent school "alongside" the Old University of Chicago and separated from the old school decades earlier to Morgan Park. This became the Divinity School in 1891, the first professional school at the University of Chicago.

Harper recruited acclaimed Yale baseball and football player Amos Alonzo Stagg from the Young Men's Christian Association training school at Springfield to coach the school's football program. Stagg was given a position on the faculty, the first such athletic position in the United States. While coaching at the university, Stagg invented the numbered football jersey, the huddle, and the lighted playing field. Stagg is the namesake of the university's Stagg Field.

The business school was founded in 1898, and the law school was founded in 1902. Harper died in 1906 and was replaced by a succession of three presidents whose tenures lasted until 1929. During this period, the Oriental Institute was founded to support and interpret archeological work in what was then called the Near East.

In the 1890s, the university, fearful that its vast resources would injure smaller schools by drawing away good students, affiliated with several regional colleges and universities: Des Moines College, Kalamazoo College, Butler University, and Stetson University. In 1896, the university affiliated with Shimer College in Mount Carroll, Illinois. Under the terms of the affiliation, the schools were required to have courses of study comparable to those at the university, to notify the university early of any contemplated faculty appointments or dismissals, to make no faculty appointment without the university's approval, and to send copies of examinations for suggestions. The University of Chicago agreed to confer a degree on any graduating senior from an affiliated school who made a grade of A for all four years, and on any other graduate who took twelve weeks additional study at the University of Chicago. A student or faculty member of an affiliated school was entitled to free tuition at the University of Chicago, and Chicago students were eligible to attend an affiliated school on the same terms and receive credit for their work. The University of Chicago also agreed to provide affiliated schools with books and scientific apparatus and supplies at cost; special instructors and lecturers without cost except for travel expenses; and a copy of every book and journal published by the University of Chicago Press at no cost. The agreement provided that either party could terminate the affiliation on proper notice. Several University of Chicago professors disliked the program, as it involved uncompensated additional labor on their part, and they believed it cheapened the academic reputation of the university. The program passed into history by 1910.

1920s–1980s 

In 1929, the university's fifth president, 30-year-old legal philosophy scholar Robert Maynard Hutchins, took office. The university underwent many changes during his 24-year tenure. Hutchins reformed the undergraduate college's liberal-arts curriculum known as the Common Core, organized the university's graduate work into four divisions, and eliminated varsity football from the university in an attempt to emphasize academics over athletics. During his term, the University of Chicago Hospitals (now called the University of Chicago Medical Center) finished construction and enrolled their first medical students. Also, the philosophy oriented Committee on Social Thought, an institution distinctive of the university, was created.

Money that had been raised during the 1920s and financial backing from the Rockefeller Foundation helped the school to survive through the Great Depression. Nonetheless, in 1933, Hutchins proposed an unsuccessful plan to merge the University of Chicago and Northwestern University into a single university. During World War II, the university's Metallurgical Laboratory made ground-breaking contributions to the Manhattan Project. The university was the site of the first isolation of plutonium and of the creation of the first artificial, self-sustained nuclear reaction by Enrico Fermi in 1942.

It has been noted that the university did not provide standard oversight regarding Bruno Bettelheim and his tenure as director of the Orthogenic School for Disturbed Children from 1944 to 1973.

In the early 1950s, student applications declined as a result of increasing crime and poverty in the Hyde Park neighborhood. In response, the university became a major sponsor of a controversial urban renewal project for Hyde Park, which profoundly affected both the neighborhood's architecture and street plan. During this period the university, like Shimer College and 10 others, adopted an early entrant program that allowed very young students to attend college; also, students enrolled at Shimer were enabled to transfer automatically to the University of Chicago after their second year, having taken comparable or identical examinations and courses.

The university experienced its share of student unrest during the 1960s, beginning in 1962 when then-freshman Bernie Sanders helped lead a 15-day sit-in at the college's administration building in a protest over the university's segregationist off-campus rental policies. After continued turmoil, a university committee in 1967 issued what became known as the Kalven Report. The report, a two-page statement of the university's policy in "social and political action," declared that "To perform its mission in the society, a university must sustain an extraordinary environment of freedom of inquiry and maintain an independence from political fashions, passions, and pressures." The report has since been used to justify decisions such as the university's refusal to divest from South Africa in the 1980s and Darfur in the late 2000s.

In 1969, more than 400 students, angry about the dismissal of a popular professor, Marlene Dixon, occupied the Administration Building for two weeks. After the sit-in ended, when Dixon turned down a one-year reappointment, 42 students were expelled and 81 were suspended, the most severe response to student occupations of any American university during the student movement.

In 1978, history scholar Hanna Holborn Gray, then the provost and acting president of Yale University, became President of the University of Chicago, a position she held for 15 years. She was the first woman in the United States to hold the presidency of a major university.

1990s–2010s 

In 1999, then-President Hugo Sonnenschein announced plans to relax the university's famed core curriculum, reducing the number of required courses from 21 to 15. When The New York Times, The Economist, and other major news outlets picked up this story, the university became the focal point of a national debate on education. The changes were ultimately implemented, but the controversy played a role in Sonnenschein's decision to resign in 2000.

From the mid-2000s, the university began a number of multimillion-dollar expansion projects. In 2008, the University of Chicago announced plans to establish the Milton Friedman Institute, which attracted both support and controversy from faculty members and  The institute would cost around $200 million and occupy the buildings of the Chicago Theological Seminary. During the same year, investor David G. Booth donated $300 million to the university's Booth School of Business, which is the largest gift in the university's history and the largest gift ever to any business school. In 2009, planning or construction on several new buildings, half of which cost $100 million or more, was underway. Since 2011, major construction projects have included the Jules and Gwen Knapp Center for Biomedical Discovery, a ten-story medical research center, and further additions to the medical campus of the University of Chicago Medical Center. In 2014 the university launched the public phase of a $4.5 billion fundraising campaign. In September 2015, the university received $100 million from The Pearson Family Foundation to establish The Pearson Institute for the Study and Resolution of Global Conflicts and The Pearson Global Forum at the Harris School of Public Policy.

In 2019, the university created its first school in three decades, the Pritzker School of Molecular Engineering.

Campus

Main campus 

The northern and southern portions of campus are separated by the Midway Plaisance, a large, linear park created for the 1893 World's Columbian Exposition. In 2011, Travel+Leisure listed the university as one of the most beautiful college campuses in the United States.

The first buildings of the campus, which make up what is now known as the Main Quadrangles, were part of a master plan conceived by two University of Chicago trustees and plotted by Chicago architect Henry Ives Cobb. The Main Quadrangles consist of six quadrangles, each surrounded by buildings, bordering one larger quadrangle. The buildings of the Main Quadrangles were designed by Cobb, Shepley, Rutan and Coolidge, Holabird & Roche, and other architectural firms in a mixture of the Victorian Gothic and Collegiate Gothic styles, patterned on the colleges of the University of Oxford. (Mitchell Tower, for example, is modeled after Oxford's Magdalen Tower, and the university Commons, Hutchinson Hall, replicates Christ Church Hall.) In celebration of the 2018 Illinois Bicentennial, the University of Chicago Quadrangles were selected as one of the Illinois 200 Great Places by the American Institute of Architects Illinois component (AIA Illinois).

After the 1940s, the campus's Gothic style began to give way to modern styles. In 1955, Eero Saarinen was contracted to develop a second master plan, which led to the construction of buildings both north and south of the Midway, including the Laird Bell Law Quadrangle (a complex designed by Saarinen); a series of arts buildings; a building designed by Ludwig Mies van der Rohe for the university's School of Social Service Administration, a building which is to become the home of the Harris School of Public Policy by Edward Durrell Stone, and the Regenstein Library, the largest building on campus, a brutalist structure designed by Walter Netsch of the Chicago firm Skidmore, Owings & Merrill. Another master plan, designed in 1999 and updated in 2004, produced the Gerald Ratner Athletics Center (2003), the Max Palevsky Residential Commons (2001), South Campus Residence Hall and dining commons (2009), a new children's hospital, and other construction, expansions, and restorations. In 2011, the university completed the glass dome-shaped Joe and Rika Mansueto Library, which provides a grand reading room for the university library and prevents the need for an off-campus book depository.

The site of Chicago Pile-1 is a National Historic Landmark and is marked by the Henry Moore sculpture Nuclear Energy. Robie House, a Frank Lloyd Wright building acquired by the university in 1963, is a UNESCO World Heritage Site as well as a National Historic Landmark, as is room 405 of the George Herbert Jones Laboratory, where Glenn T. Seaborg and his team were the first to isolate plutonium. Hitchcock Hall, an undergraduate dormitory, is on the National Register of Historic Places.

Safety 
In November 2021 a university graduate was robbed and fatally shot on a sidewalk in a residential area in Hyde Park near campus; a total of three University of Chicago students were killed by gunfire incidents in 2021. These incidents prompted student protests and an open letter to university leadership signed by more than 300 faculty members.

Satellite campuses 
The university also maintains facilities apart from its main campus. The university's Booth School of Business maintains campuses in Hong Kong, London, and the downtown Streeterville neighborhood of Chicago. The Center in Paris, a campus located on the left bank of the Seine in Paris, hosts various undergraduate and graduate study programs. In fall 2010, the university opened a center in Beijing, near Renmin University's campus in Haidian District. The most recent additions are a center in New Delhi, India, which opened in 2014, and a center in Hong Kong which opened in 2018.

Administration and finance 

The university is governed by a board of trustees. The board of trustees oversees the long-term development and plans of the university and manages fundraising efforts, and is composed of 55 members including the university president. Directly beneath the president are the provost, fourteen vice presidents (including the chief financial officer, chief investment officer, and vice president for campus life and student services), the directors of Argonne National Laboratory and Fermilab, the secretary of the university, and the student ombudsperson. As of May 2022, the current chairman of the board of trustees is David Rubenstein.  The current provost is Ka Yee Christina Lee, who will be replaced by Kathleen Baicker in March 2023. The current president of the University of Chicago is chemist Paul Alivisatos, who assumed the role on September 1, 2021. Robert Zimmer, the previous president, transitioned into the new role of chancellor of the university.

Since 2016, the university's board of trustees has resisted pressure from students and faculty to divest its investments from fossil fuel companies. Part of former university President Zimmer's financial plan for the university was an increase in accumulation of debt to finance large building projects. This drew both support and criticism from many in the university community.

Academics 

The academic bodies of the University of Chicago consist of the College, five divisions of graduate research, six professional schools, and the Graham School of Continuing Liberal and Professional Studies. The university also contains a library system, the University of Chicago Press, and the University of Chicago Medical Center, and oversees several laboratories, including Fermi National Accelerator Laboratory (Fermilab), Argonne National Laboratory, and the Marine Biological Laboratory. The university is accredited by The Higher Learning Commission.

The university runs on a quarter system in which the academic year is divided into four terms: Summer (June–August), Autumn (September–December), Winter (January–March), and Spring (April–June). Full-time undergraduate students take three to four courses every quarter for approximately eleven weeks before their quarterly academic breaks. The school year typically begins in late September and ends in mid-June.

Rankings 

The University of Chicago has an extensive record of producing successful business leaders and billionaires. ARWU has consistently placed the University of Chicago among the top 10 universities in the world, and the 2021 QS World University Rankings placed the university in 9th place worldwide. The university's law and business schools rank among the top three professional schools in the United States. The business school is currently ranked first in the US by US News & World Report and first in the world by The Economist, while the law school is ranked third by US News & World Report and first by Above the Law.

Chicago has also been consistently recognized to be one of the top 15 university brands in the world, retaining the number three spot in the 2019 U.S. News Best Colleges Rankings. In a corporate study carried out by The New York Times, the university's graduates were shown to be among the most valued in the world.

Undergraduate college 

The College of the University of Chicago grants Bachelor of Arts and Bachelor of Science degrees in 51 academic majors and 33 minors. The college's academics are divided into five divisions: the Biological Sciences Collegiate Division, the Physical Sciences Collegiate Division, the Social Sciences Collegiate Division, the Humanities Collegiate Division, and the New Collegiate Division. The first four are sections within their corresponding graduate divisions, while the New Collegiate Division administers interdisciplinary majors and studies which do not fit in one of the other four divisions.

Undergraduate students are required to take a distribution of courses to satisfy the university's general education requirements, commonly known as the Core Curriculum. In 2012–2013, the Core classes at Chicago were limited to 17 courses, and are generally led by a full-time professor (as opposed to a teaching assistant). As of the 2013–2014 school year, 15 courses and demonstrated proficiency in a foreign language are required under the Core. Undergraduate courses at the University of Chicago are known for their demanding standards, heavy workload and academic difficulty; according to Uni in the USA, "Among the academic cream of American universities – Harvard, Yale, Princeton, MIT, and the University of Chicago – it is UChicago that can most convincingly claim to provide the most rigorous, intense learning experience."

Graduate schools and committees 
The university graduate schools and committees are divided into five divisions: Biological Sciences, Humanities, Physical Sciences, Social Sciences, and the Pritzker School of Molecular Engineering (PME). In the autumn quarter of 2015, the university enrolled 3,588 graduate students: 438 in the Biological Sciences Division, 801 in the Humanities Division, 1,102 in the Physical Sciences Division, 1,165 in the Social Sciences Division, and 52 in PME.

The university is home to several committees for interdisciplinary scholarship, including the John U. Nef Committee on Social Thought.

Professional schools 
The university contains eight professional schools: the University of Chicago Law School, the Pritzker School of Medicine, the Booth School of Business, the University of Chicago Divinity School, the University of Chicago Harris School of Public Policy, the University of Chicago School of Social Service Administration, the Graham School of Continuing Liberal and Professional Studies (which offers non-degree courses and certificates as well as degree programs) and the Pritzker School of Molecular Engineering.

The Law School is accredited by the American Bar Association, the Divinity School is accredited by the Commission on Accrediting of the Association of Theological Schools in the United States and Canada, and Pritzker is accredited by the Liaison Committee on Medical Education.

Associated academic institutions 

The university runs a number of academic institutions and programs apart from its undergraduate and postgraduate schools. It operates the University of Chicago Laboratory Schools (a private day school for K-12 students and day care), and a public charter school with four campuses on the South Side of Chicago administered by the university's Urban Education Institute. In addition, the Hyde Park Day School, a school for students with learning disabilities, and the Sonia Shankman Orthogenic School, a residential treatment program for those with behavioral and emotional problems, maintains a location on the University of Chicago campus. Since 1983, the University of Chicago has maintained the University of Chicago School Mathematics Project, a mathematics program used in urban primary and secondary schools. The university runs a program called the Council on Advanced Studies in the Humanities and Social Sciences, which administers interdisciplinary workshops to provide a forum for graduate students, faculty, and visiting scholars to present scholarly work in progress.
The university also operates the University of Chicago Press, the largest university press in the United States.

Library system 

The University of Chicago Library system encompasses six libraries that contain a total of 11 million volumes, the 9th most among library systems in the United States. The university's main library is the Regenstein Library, which contains one of the largest collections of print volumes in the United States. The Joe and Rika Mansueto Library, built in 2011, houses a large study space and an automated book storage and retrieval system. The John Crerar Library contains more than 1.4 million volumes in the biological, medical and physical sciences and collections in general science and the philosophy and history of science, medicine, and technology. The university also operates a number of special libraries, including the D'Angelo Law Library, the Social Service Administration Library, and the Eckhart Library for mathematics and computer science. Harper Memorial Library is now a reading and study room.

Research 

According to the National Science Foundation, University of Chicago spent $423.9 million on research and development in 2018, ranking it 60th in the nation. It is classified among "R1: Doctoral Universities – Very high research activity" and is a founding member of the Association of American Universities and was a member of the Committee on Institutional Cooperation from 1946 through June 29, 2016, when the group's name was changed to the Big Ten Academic Alliance. The University of Chicago is not a member of the rebranded consortium, but will continue to be a collaborator.

The university operates more than 140 research centers and institutes on campus. Among these are the Oriental Institute—a museum and research center for Near Eastern studies owned and operated by the university—and a number of National Resource Centers, including the Center for Middle Eastern Studies. Chicago also operates or is affiliated with several research institutions apart from the university proper. The university manages Argonne National Laboratory, part of the United States Department of Energy's national laboratory system, and co-manages Fermi National Accelerator Laboratory (Fermilab), a nearby particle physics laboratory, as well as a stake in the Apache Point Observatory in Sunspot, New Mexico. Faculty and students at the adjacent Toyota Technological Institute at Chicago collaborate with the university. In 2013, the university formed an affiliation with the formerly independent Marine Biological Laboratory in Woods Hole, Mass. Although formally unrelated, the National Opinion Research Center is located on Chicago's campus.

The University of Chicago has been the site of some important experiments and academic movements. In economics, the university has played an important role in shaping ideas about the free market and is the namesake of the Chicago school of economics, the school of economic thought supported by Milton Friedman and other economists. The university's sociology department was the first independent sociology department in the United States and gave birth to the Chicago school of sociology. In physics, the university was the site of the Chicago Pile-1 (the first controlled, self-sustaining man-made nuclear chain reaction, part of the Manhattan Project), of Robert Millikan's oil-drop experiment that calculated the charge of the electron, and of the development of radiocarbon dating by Willard F. Libby in 1947. The chemical experiment that tested how life originated on early Earth, the Miller–Urey experiment, was conducted at the university. REM sleep was discovered at the university in 1953 by Nathaniel Kleitman and Eugene Aserinsky.

The University of Chicago (Department of Astronomy and Astrophysics) operated the Yerkes Observatory in Williams Bay, Wisconsin from 1897 until 2018, where the largest operating refracting telescope in the world and other telescopes are located.

Arts 

The UChicago Arts program joins academic departments and programs in the Division of the Humanities and the college, as well as professional organizations including the Court Theatre, the Oriental Institute, the Smart Museum of Art, the Renaissance Society, University of Chicago Presents, and student arts organizations. The university has an artist-in-residence program and scholars in performance studies, contemporary art criticism, and film history. It has offered a doctorate in music composition since 1933 and cinema and media studies since 2000, a master of fine arts in visual arts (early 1970s), and a Master of Arts in the humanities with a creative writing track (2000). It has bachelor's degree programs in visual arts, music, and art history, and, more recently, cinema and media studies (1996) and theater and performance studies (2002). The college's general education core includes a "dramatic, musical, and visual arts" requirement, inviting students to study the history of the arts, stage desire, or begin working with sculpture. Several thousand major and non-major undergraduates enroll annually in creative and performing arts classes. UChicago is often considered the birthplace of improvisational comedy as the Compass Players student comedy troupe evolved into The Second City improv theater troupe in 1959. The Reva and David Logan Center for the Arts opened in October 2012, five years after a $35 million gift from alumnus David Logan and his wife Reva. The center includes spaces for exhibitions, performances, classes, and media production. The Logan Center was designed by Tod Williams and Billie Tsien.

Student body and admissions

Admissions 

In Fall 2021, the university enrolled 7,559 undergraduate students, 10,893 graduate students, and 449 non-degree students. The college class of 2025 is composed of 53% male students and 47% female students. Twenty-seven percent of the class identify as Asian, 19% as Hispanic, and 10% as Black. Eighteen percent of the class is international.

Admissions to the University of Chicago has become highly selective over the past two decades, reflecting changes in the application process, school popularity, and marketing strategy. Between 1996 and 2022, the acceptance rate of the college fell from 71% to 4.9%. For the Class of 2026, the acceptance rate was 5.4%.

The middle 50% band of SAT scores for the undergraduate class of 2025 was 1510–1570 (98th-99th percentiles), the average MCAT score for students entering the Pritzker School of Medicine class of 2024 was 519 (97th percentile), the median GMAT score for students entering the full-time Booth MBA program class of 2023 was 740 (97th percentile), and the median LSAT score for students entering the Law School class of 2021 was 172 (99th percentile).

In 2018, the University of Chicago attracted national headlines by becoming the first major research university to no longer require SAT/ACT scores from college applicants.

Athletics 

The University of Chicago hosts 19 varsity sports teams: 10 men's teams and 9 women's teams, all called the Maroons, with 502 students participating in the 2012–2013 school year.

The Maroons compete in the NCAA's Division III as members of the University Athletic Association (UAA). The university was a founding member of the Big Ten Conference and participated in the NCAA Division I men's basketball and football and was a regular participant in the men's basketball tournament. In 1935, the University of Chicago reached the Sweet Sixteen. In 1935, Chicago Maroons football player Jay Berwanger became the first winner of the Heisman Trophy. However, the university chose to withdraw from the Big Ten Conference in 1946 after University president Robert Maynard Hutchins de-emphasized varsity athletics in 1939 and dropped football. In 1969, Chicago reinstated football as a Division III team, resuming playing its home games at the new Stagg Field. UChicago is also the home of the ultimate frisbee team Chicago Junk.

Student life

Student organizations 

Students at the University of Chicago operate more than 400 clubs and organizations known as Recognized Student Organizations (RSOs). These include cultural and religious groups, academic clubs and teams, and common-interest organizations. Notable extracurricular groups include the University of Chicago College Bowl Team, which has won 118 tournaments and 15 national championships, leading both categories internationally. The university's competitive Model United Nations team was the top-ranked team in North America in 2013–14, 2014–2015, 2015–2016, and again for the 2017–2018 season. The university's Model UN team is also the first to be in the top 5 for almost a decade, according to Best Delegate. Among notable student organizations are the nation's longest continuously running student film society Doc Films; the organizing committee for the University of Chicago Scavenger Hunt; the weekly student newspaper The Chicago Maroon; the satirical Chicago Shady Dealer; an improvisational theater and sketch comedy group Off-Off Campus; The Blue Chips, an investing club managing $150k in assets; and UT, performing up to 12 shows a year across campus. 

The University of Chicago is home to eight student-run a cappella groups, several of which compete regularly at the International Championship of Collegiate A Cappella (ICCA). The school's two most prominent co-ed a cappella groups are Voices in Your Head, which competed at the ICCA finals in 2012, 2015, 2017, 2018, and 2022, as well as the Ransom Notes, which competed at the ICCA finals in 2021. Other successful a cappella groups on campus include the all-female group Unaccompanied Women, which is also the school's oldest established group, as well as the all-male group Run For Cover, which performs in prolific events across the Midwest every year.

Student government 
All recognized student organizations, from the University of Chicago Scavenger Hunt to Model UN, in addition to academic teams, sports clubs, arts groups, and more are funded by The University of Chicago Student Government. Student Government consists of graduate and undergraduate students elected to represent members from their respective academic units. It is led by an executive committee, chaired by a president with the assistance of two vice presidents, one for administration and the other for student life, elected together as a slate by the student body each spring. Its annual budget is greater than $2 million.

Fraternities and sororities 
There are 13 fraternities at the university: Alpha Delta Phi (Chicago chapter), Alpha Epsilon Pi (Lambda chapter), Alpha Sigma Phi, Delta Kappa Epsilon (Delta Delta), Delta Upsilon (Chicago chapter), Lambda Phi Epsilon (Psi chapter), Phi Delta Theta (IL Beta chapter), Phi Gamma Delta (Chi Upsilon chapter), Phi Iota Alpha (Chicago Colony chapter), Psi Upsilon (Omega chapter), Sigma Chi (Omicron Omicron chapter), Pi Kappa Alpha (Iota Xi chapter) and Zeta Psi (Omega Alpha chapter). There are four sororities: Alpha Omicron Pi (Phi Chi chapter), Delta Gamma (Eta Zeta chapter), Kappa Alpha Theta (Epsilon Phi chapter) and Pi Beta Phi (IL Kappa chapter) at the University of Chicago, as well as one co-ed community service fraternity are Alpha Phi Omega (Gamma Sigma chapter).  Social fraternities and sororities are not recognized by the university as registered student organizations. Four of the sororities are members of the National Panhellenic Conference There is no Interfraternity Council on campus. The Multicultural Greek Council (MGC) consists of 3 fraternities and 4 sororities: Alpha Phi Alpha fraternity (Theta chapter), Alpha Kappa Alpha sorority (Beta chapter), Delta Sigma Theta sorority (Lambda chapter), Phi Iota Alpha fraternity (University of Chicago Colony), Lambda Phi Epsilon fraternity (Psi chapter), Lambda Pi Chi sorority (Chi chapter), and alpha Kappa Delta Phi sorority (University of Chicago, associate chapter). , approximately 20 to 25 percent of students are members of fraternities or sororities. This is an increase from the numbers published in the year 2007 by the student activities office stating that one in ten undergraduates participated in Greek life.

Student housing 

On-campus undergraduate students at the University of Chicago participate in a house system in which each student is assigned to one of the university's 7 residence hall buildings and to a smaller community within their residence hall called a "house". There are 39 houses, with an average of 70 students in each house. Traditionally only first years were required to live in housing, but starting with the Class of 2023, students are required to live in housing for the first 2 years of enrollment. About 60% of undergraduate students live on campus.

For graduate students, the university owns and operates 28 apartment buildings near campus.

Traditions 

Every May since 1987, the University of Chicago has held the University of Chicago Scavenger Hunt, in which large teams of students compete to obtain notoriously esoteric items from a list. Since 1963, the Festival of the Arts (FOTA) takes over campus for 7–10 days of exhibitions and interactive artistic endeavors. Every January, the university holds a week-long winter festival, Kuviasungnerk/Kangeiko (Kuvia), which includes early morning exercise routines and fitness workshops. The university also annually holds a summer carnival and concert called Summer Breeze that hosts outside musicians and is home to Doc Films, a student film society founded in 1932 that screens films nightly at the university. Since 1946, the university has organized the Latke-Hamantash Debate, which involves humorous discussions about the relative merits and meanings of latkes and hamantashen.

People 

, there have been 100 Nobel laureates affiliated with the University of Chicago, 21 of whom were pursuing research or on faculty at the university at the time of the award announcement. Notable alumni and faculty affiliated with the university include 33 Nobel laureates in Economics.

In addition, many Chicago alumni and scholars have won the Fulbright awards and 53 have matriculated as Rhodes Scholars.

Alumni 

In 2019, the University of Chicago claimed 188,000 alumni. While the university's first president, William Rainey Harper stressed the importance of perennial theory over practicality in his institution's curriculum, this has not stopped the alumni of Chicago from being among the wealthiest in the world.

In business, notable alumni include Microsoft CEO Satya Nadella, Oracle Corporation founder and the sixth-richest man in America Larry Ellison (who attended for one term but chose to leave before final exams), Goldman Sachs and MF Global CEO as well as former governor of New Jersey Jon Corzine, McKinsey & Company founder and author of the first management accounting textbook James O. McKinsey, co-founder of the Blackstone Group Peter G. Peterson, co-founder of AQR Capital Management Cliff Asness, founder of Dimensional Fund Advisors David Booth, founder of the Carlyle Group David Rubenstein, former COO of Goldman Sachs Andrew Alper, billionaire investor and founder of Oaktree Capital Management Howard Marks (investor), Bloomberg L.P. CEO Daniel Doctoroff, Credit Suisse CEO Brady Dougan, Morningstar, Inc. founder and CEO Joe Mansueto, Chicago Cubs owner and chairman Thomas S. Ricketts, and NBA commissioner Adam Silver.

Notable alumni in the field of law, government and politics include Supreme Court justice John Paul Stevens; the lord chief justice of England and Wales Lord Thomas of Cwmgiedd; President of the Supreme Court of Israel Shimon Agranat; Attorney General and federal judge Robert Bork; attorneys general Ramsey Clark, John Ashcroft and Edward Levi; Prime Minister of Canada William Lyon Mackenzie King; 33rd prime minister of New Zealand Geoffrey Palmer; 11th prime minister of Poland Marek Belka; former Taiwan Vice President Lien Chan; Governor of the Bank of Japan Masaaki Shirakawa; David Axelrod, advisor to presidents Barack Obama and Bill Clinton; the founder of modern community organizing Saul Alinsky; Prohibition agent Eliot Ness; political scientist and Sino-American expert Tsou Tang; current Chicago mayor Lori Lightfoot; the first female African-American senator Carol Moseley Braun; United States senator from Vermont and Democratic presidential candidate in 2016 and 2020 Bernie Sanders; former World Bank president Paul Wolfowitz; and Amien Rais, professor and former chairman of the People's Consultative Assembly of the Republic of Indonesia.

Notable alumni who are leaders in higher education, have emerged from almost all parts of the university: college president and chancellor Rebecca Chopp; current president of Middlebury College Laurie L. Patton; master of Clare College, Cambridge and vice-chancellor of University of Cambridge Eric Ashby, Baron Ashby; president of Princeton University Christopher L. Eisgruber; former president of Morehouse College Robert M. Franklin, Jr.; president of the Open University of Israel Jacob Metzer; and president of Shimer College Susan Henking.

In journalism, notable alumni include New York Times columnist and commentator on PBS News Hour David Brooks, Washington Post columnist David Broder, Washington Post publisher Katharine Graham, reporter and commentator Virginia Graham, investigative journalist and political writer Seymour Hersh, The Progressive columnist Milton Mayer, four-time Pulitzer Prize winning journalist Rick Atkinson, statistical analyst and FiveThirtyEight founder and creator Nate Silver, and CBS News correspondent Rebecca Jarvis.

In literature, author of the New York Times bestseller Before I Fall Lauren Oliver, Pulitzer Prize-winning novelist Philip Roth; Canadian-born Pulitzer Prize and Nobel Prize for Literature winning writer Saul Bellow; political philosopher, literary critic and author of the New York Times bestseller The Closing of the American Mind Allan Bloom; author of The Big Country and Matt Helm spy novels Donald Hamilton; The Good War author Studs Terkel; writer, essayist, filmmaker, teacher, and political activist Susan Sontag; analytic philosopher and Stanford University professor of Comparative literature Richard Rorty; professor of government and author of The Rhetorical Presidency Jeffrey K. Tulis; cultural commentator, author, and president of St. Stephen's College (now Bard College) Bernard Iddings Bell; and novelist and satirist Kurt Vonnegut are notable alumni.

In the arts and entertainment, minimalist composer Philip Glass, dancer, choreographer and leader in the field of dance anthropology Katherine Dunham, Bungie founder and developer of the Halo video game series Alex Seropian, Serial host Sarah Koenig, actor Ed Asner, actress Anna Chlumsky, Pulitzer Prize for Criticism winning film critic and the subject of the 2014 documentary film Life Itself Roger Ebert, director, writer, and comedian Mike Nichols, film director and screenwriter Philip Kaufman, and photographer and writer Carl Van Vechten, photographer and writer, are graduates.

In science, alumni include astronomers Carl Sagan, a prominent contributor to the scientific research of extraterrestrial life, and Edwin Hubble, known for "Hubble's Law", NASA astronaut John M. Grunsfeld, geneticist James Watson, best known as one of the co-discoverers of the structure of DNA, vaccinologist Maurice Hilleman, whose vaccines save nearly 8 million lives each year, experimental physicist Luis Alvarez, popular environmentalist David Suzuki, nuclear physicist and researcher Stanton T. Friedman, balloonist Jeannette Piccard, biologists Ernest Everett Just and Lynn Margulis, computer scientist Richard Hamming, the creator of the Hamming Code, lithium-ion battery developer John B. Goodenough, mathematician and Fields Medal recipient Paul Joseph Cohen, geochemist Clair Cameron Patterson, who developed the uranium–lead dating method into lead–lead dating, geologist and geophysicist M. King Hubbert, known for the Hubbert curve and Hubbert peak theory, the main components of peak oil, and "Queen of Carbon" Mildred Dresselhaus. Ray Solomonoff, one of the founders of the field of machine learning as well as Kolmogorov complexity, got a BS and MS in physics in 1951, studying under Rudolf Carnap.

In economics, notable Nobel Memorial Prize in Economic Sciences winners Milton Friedman, a major advisor to Republican U.S. president Ronald Reagan, Conservative British prime minister Margaret Thatcher and Chilean military dictator Augusto Pinochet, George Stigler, Nobel laureate and proponent of regulatory capture theory, Herbert A. Simon, responsible for the modern interpretation of the concept of organizational decision-making, Paul Samuelson, the first American to win the Nobel Memorial Prize in Economic Sciences, and Eugene Fama, known for his work on portfolio theory, asset pricing and stock market behavior, are all graduates. American economist, social theorist, political philosopher, and author Thomas Sowell is also an alumnus. Brazil's minister of the economy Paulo Guedes received his Ph.D. from UChicago in 1978.

Other prominent alumni include anthropologists David Graeber and Donald Johanson, who is best known for discovering the fossil of a female hominid australopithecine known as "Lucy" in the Afar Triangle region, psychologist John B. Watson, American psychologist who established the psychological school of behaviorism, communication theorist Harold Innis, political theorist Anne Norton, chess grandmaster Samuel Reshevsky, and conservative international relations scholar and White House coordinator of security planning for the National Security Council Samuel P. Huntington.

American Civil Rights Movement leaders Vernon Johns, considered by some to be the founder of the American Civil Rights Movement, American educator, socialist and cofounder of the Highlander Folk School Myles Horton, civil rights attorney and chairman of the Fair Employment Practices Committee Earl B. Dickerson, Tuskegee Airmen commander Benjamin O. Davis, Jr., African-American history scholar and journalist Carter G. Woodson, and Nubian scholar Solange Ashby are all alumni.

Three students from the university have been prosecuted in notable court cases: the infamous thrill killers Nathan Leopold and Richard Loeb and high school science teacher John T. Scopes who was tried in the Scopes Monkey Trial for teaching evolution.

Faculty 

Notable faculty in economics include Friedrich Hayek, Frank Knight, Milton Friedman, George Stigler, James Heckman, Gary Becker, Robert Fogel, Robert Lucas, Jr., John A. List, and Eugene Fama. Additionally, the John Bates Clark Medal, which is rewarded annually to the best economist under the age of 40, has also been awarded to 4 current members of the university faculty.

Notable faculty in physics have included the speed of light calculator A. A. Michelson, elementary charge calculator Robert A. Millikan, discoverer of the Compton Effect Arthur H. Compton, the creator of the first nuclear reactor Enrico Fermi, "the father of the hydrogen bomb" Edward Teller, "one of the most brilliant and productive experimental physicists of the twentieth century" Luis Walter Alvarez, Murray Gell-Mann who introduced the quark, second female Nobel laureate Maria Goeppert-Mayer, the youngest American winner of the Nobel Prize Tsung-Dao Lee, and astrophysicist Subrahmanyan Chandrasekhar.

In law, former U.S. president Barack Obama, the most cited legal scholar of the 20th century Richard Posner, Supreme Court justices Elena Kagan, Antonin Scalia, and John Paul Stevens, and Nobel laureate in economics Ronald Coase have served on the faculty. Other distinguished scholars who have served on the faculty include Karl Llewellyn, Edward Levi, Cass Sunstein, and legal historian Stanley Nider Katz.

Philosophers who were members of the faculty include Nobel Prize-winning philosopher Bertrand Russell, John Dewey (central figure in pragmatism and founder of functional psychology), philosopher and political theorist Hannah Arendt, George H. Mead (who is considered one of the founders of social psychology and the American sociological tradition), and Leo Strauss (prominent philosopher and the founder of the Straussian School in philosophy). Notable writers T.S. Eliot, Ralph Ellison, and J.M. Coetzee have all served on the faculty.

Past faculty have also included astronomer Gerard Kuiper, biochemist and National Women's Hall of Fame member Florence B. Seibert, biologist Susan Lindquist, chemists Glenn T. Seaborg, Yuan T. Lee (the developer of the actinide concept and Nobel Prize winner), egyptologist James Henry Breasted, mathematician Alberto Calderón, Friedrich Hayek (one of the leading figures of the Austrian School of Economics and Nobel prize winner), meteorologist Ted Fujita, linguistic anthropologist Michael Silverstein, Nobel Prize winning novelist Saul Bellow, American politics scholar Herbert Storing, political philosopher and author Allan Bloom, conservative political philosopher and historian Richard M. Weaver, cancer researchers Charles Brenton Huggins and Janet Rowley, one of the most important figures in the early development of the discipline of linguistics Edward Sapir, the founder of McKinsey & Co. James O. McKinsey, and Nobel Prize-winning physicist James Cronin.

Current faculty include the philosophers Jean-Luc Marion, James F. Conant, Robert Pippin, and Kyoto Prize winner Martha Nussbaum; political scientists John Mearsheimer and Robert Pape; anthropologist Marshall Sahlins; historians Dipesh Chakrabarty, David Nirenberg, and Kenneth Pomeranz; paleontologists Neil Shubin and Paul Sereno; evolutionary biologist Jerry Coyne; Nobel Prize-winning economists Eugene Fama, James Heckman, Lars Peter Hansen, Roger Myerson, Richard Thaler, Robert Lucas, Jr., and Douglas Diamond; Freakonomics author and noted economist Steven Levitt; Voltage Effect author and noted economist John List; former governor of India's central bank Raghuram Rajan; and former chairman of President Barack Obama's Council of Economic Advisers Austan Goolsbee.

Notes

References

External links 

 
 Illinois Great Places - University of Chicago Quadrangles
 Society of Architectural Historians SAH ARCHIPEDIA entry on the University of Chicago Quadrangles

 
1890 establishments in Illinois
Educational institutions established in 1890
University of Chicago
Hyde Park, Chicago
Institutions founded by the Rockefeller family
Universities and colleges in Chicago
University of Chicago
Universities and colleges accredited by the Higher Learning Commission